Jason Kokrak (born May 22, 1985) is an American professional golfer who plays in the LIV Golf League. Previously he played on the PGA Tour.

Amateur career
Kokrak was born in North Bay, Ontario in Canada, and played high school golf at JFK High School in Warren, Ohio, where he twice led the Eagles to the Ohio state championship as Division III medalist. He went on to play college golf at Xavier University in Cincinnati and graduated in 2007. During his college career, he won both the 2006 and 2007 Ohio Amateur titles. Kokrak turned professional after graduation.

During the 2007 U.S. Amateur, Kokrak led all players with a score of 137 during the 36-hole match play qualifier at the Olympic Club in San Francisco. That same year, he made an appearance in the U.S. Open at Oakmont Country Club, when he successfully came through sectional and regional qualifying.

Professional career
Kokrak has nine career professional victories, including four on the eGolf Professional Tour. In 2010, Kokrak won twice and was the leading money winner on the tour. During that same season, he made it to the final round of qualifying School, earning conditional status on the Nationwide Tour. In 2011, he won the Championship at St. James Plantation and the Donald Ross Championship. Kokrak finished second on the eGolf Tour's money list despite playing in only three events.

In September 2011, Kokrak won his first Nationwide Tour event, the Albertsons Boise Open in Boise, Idaho. His 72-hole score of 266 (−18) at Hillcrest Country Club included rounds of 68, 68, 63, and 67. Kokrak's third round 63 included consecutive birdies on holes one through six to open the round - one short of the Nationwide Tour record of seven. He won by two strokes and earned $130,500, which vaulted him from 70th to 13th place on the season's money list. Kokrak was an alternate and the last player to earn entry into the field.

On October 16, 2011, Kokrak notched his second Nationwide Tour victory within a month with a seven shot victory at the Miccosukee Championship with rounds of 63-66-69 and a final round 66. Kokrak was in the top 10 in the field in driving distance and putts per greens in regulation, and led the field in greens hit in regulation. The $108,000 first prize vaulted Kokrak to the fourth position on the Nationwide Tour money list and virtually assured 2012 status on the PGA Tour.

On October 30, 2011, Kokrak finished the season with a T5th at the Nationwide Tour Championship with rounds of 67, 67, 75 and 75. His winnings of $36,500 solidified him as the 4th leading money winner on the Nationwide Tour with total earnings of $338,092 in only 16 events. Kokrak was able to compete on the PGA Tour in 2012 as a result of his play in 2011.

Kokrak made his first appearance as a member of the PGA Tour on January 12, 2012, at the Sony Open in Hawaii, where he finished 75th. On February 12, 2012, Kokrak notched his first top-10 finish in his PGA Tour career at the AT&T Pebble Beach National Pro-Am with rounds of 68, 67, 72, and 70 for a 277 total, which gave him a 9th-place finish. He led the field in greens in regulation (GIR) with a 77% success rate and also led his Pro-Am team to an 11th-place finish. At the 2012 Frys.com Open, Kokrak finished in a tie for second, one stroke behind Jonas Blixt. For the week, he led the field in Greens in Regulation and was 9th in driving distance, averaging 309 yards on measured drives. His $440,000 in earnings for the week moved Kokrak up 50 positions to 117th on the PGA Tour money list, with two tournaments left in the 2012 season; moving him from no status for 2013 to a chance at keeping his Tour privileges. He would finish the season 119th on the money list.

Kokrak was featured in a four-page article, "The Making of a Bomber" in the March 5, 2012 issue of Golf World. The article cited Kokrak's development as a junior golfer, his teaching influences, and insights into his equipment specifications.

In February 2016, Kokrak opened with rounds of 68-64 for a 10-under-par total to hold the 36-hole lead at the Northern Trust Open by one stroke. This was the first time in his PGA Tour career he had held a 36-hole lead. He finished the tournament tied for second, one stroke behind Bubba Watson. This equalled his career best PGA Tour finish of a tie for second, which he also achieved back in 2012 at the Frys.com Open.

In March 2019, Kokrak finished tied for second at the Valspar Championship, one stroke behind champion Paul Casey. Kokrak's T-2 finish was his third career runner-up on Tour, and his first since the 2016 Northern Trust Open. Having made every cut since The Open Championship in July, 2018, he notched three top-10 finishes during the four-event PGA Tour Florida Swing in 2019.

On October 18, 2020, Kokrak won the CJ Cup at Shadow Creek for his first PGA Tour victory after nine years and 233 starts.

In May 2021, Kokrak won his second PGA Tour event at the Charles Schwab Challenge at Colonial Country Club in Fort Worth, Texas. Kokrak shot a final round 70 to defeat Jordan Spieth by two strokes. In November 2021, Kokrak won the Hewlett Packard Enterprise Houston Open at Memorial Park Municipal Golf Course in Houston, Texas. Kokrak shot a final round 65 to win by two strokes.

Kokrak joined LIV Golf in July 2022.

Amateur wins
2006 Ohio Amateur
2007 Ohio Amateur

Professional wins (11)

PGA Tour wins (3)

Nationwide Tour wins (2)

eGolf Professional Tour wins (4)

Other wins (1)

Results in major championships
Results not in chronological order in 2020.

CUT = missed the half-way cut
"T" indicates a tie for a place
NT = No tournament due to COVID-19 pandemic

Summary

 Most consecutive cuts made – 4 (2016 U.S. Open – 2017 PGA)
 Longest streak of top-10s – 0

Results in The Players Championship

CUT = missed the halfway cut
WD = withdrew
"T" indicates a tie for a place
C = Canceled after the first round due to the COVID-19 pandemic

Results in World Golf Championships

1Cancelled due to COVID-19 pandemic

NT = No tournament
"T" = Tied
Note that the Championship and Invitational were discontinued from 2022.

See also
2011 Nationwide Tour graduates

References

External links

Profile on Xavier University Athletics site
Big-hitting Jason Kokrak steps up in '12

American male golfers
Xavier Musketeers men's golfers
PGA Tour golfers
LIV Golf players
Korn Ferry Tour graduates
Golfers from Ohio
Golfing people from Ontario
Sportspeople from North Bay, Ontario
Sportspeople from Warren, Ohio
1985 births
Living people